Biago Proto de Rubeis or Biagio Proto de Rossi (1578 – 7 April 1646) was a Catholic prelate who served as Archbishop of Messina (1626–1646).

Biography
Biagio Proto de Rossi was born in Patti, Sicily in about 1578, son of Antonello Proto and Diana Rosso. His mother was the sister of Luciano Rosso bishop of Mazara who took care of the ecclesiastical carrier of Biago, appointing him Canon of the Cathedral of Mazara. Biago earned a doctorate in utroque iure on about 1602 in Messina. At the death of his uncle, on 28 October 1602, he succeeded to be appointed vicar capitular against the will of the Chapter: he ruled the diocese of Mazara until the appointment of the new bishop in 1604. He later worked in the Apostolic Nunciature to Spain.

On 20 July 1626, he was appointed new Archbishop of Messina upon request of Philip IV of Spain, who had the advowson to present to the Pope the nominee for such office. The episcopal consecration followed on 8 November in San Giovanni dei Fiorentini by the hands of Cardinal Giulio Cesare Sacchetti. He received the pallium on next 16 November.

Biagio Proto was accused by people and by the Senate of Messina of using his jurisdictional powers for extortions, and of avarice and simony. He was summoned in Rome in 1632, and Maraldo Cellesio was sent to Messina to investigate. The result of the investigation supported the charges, however Biagio Proto was acquitted in 1639 and returned in Messina to rule his diocese.

He died on 7 April 1646 in Milazzo, and his remains were moved and buried in the Cathedral of Messina, where his tomb still is visible.

Episcopal succession
While bishop, he was the principal consecrator of:
Pietro Corsetto, Bishop of Cefalù (1638);
Francesco d'Elia e Rossi, Bishop of Siracusa (1639);
Giovanni Torresiglia, Archbishop of Monreale (1644);

and the principal co-consecrator of:
Ottavio Branciforte, Bishop of Cefalù (1633);
Diego Requeséns, Titular Archbishop of Cartagine (1637);
Prospero Spínola, Bishop of Luni e Sarzana (1637);
Jerónimo Domín Funes, Bishop of Gaeta (1637);
Giovanni Battista Falesi, Bishop of Mottola (1638);
Gaspare Conturla, Bishop of Venosa (1638);
Francesco Tontori, Bishop of Ischia (1638); and
Felice Tamburelli, Bishop of Sora (1638).

References

External links and additional sources
 (for Chronology of Bishops) 
 (for Chronology of Bishops) 

17th-century Roman Catholic bishops in Sicily
Bishops appointed by Pope Urban VIII
1578 births
1646 deaths